Jequitinhonha is a Brazilian municipality located in the northeast of the state of Minas Gerais.

Location

The population  was estimated to be 25,474 people living in a total area of 3,518 km². The city belongs to the mesoregion of Jequitinhonha and to the microregion of Almenara.

Jequitinhonha is located on the river of the same name.  The elevation is 223 meters.  It became a municipality in 1911.  The distance to the state capital, Belo Horizonte is 582 km.

Neighboring municipalities are: Joaíma, Felisburgo, Rubim, Almenara and Pedra Azul.

The municipality contains most of the  Mata Escura Biological Reserve, created in 2003.

Economy

The main economic activities are cattle raising and the cultivation of coffee, sugarcane and corn.  The GDP in 2006 was R$66,471,000.  There were 02 banking agencies .  In the same year there were 699 automobiles, which was a ratio of one automobile for every 30 people.   In the rural area there were 1,905 producers of which only 51 had tractors.  There were 88,000 head of cattle in 2006. This municipality is isolated from major population centers and suffers from drought and poor soils.

Social indicators

Municipal Human Development Index: .668 (2000)
State ranking: 679 out of 853 municipalities 
National ranking: 3,492 out of 5,138 municipalities 
Degree of urbanization: 70.21% (2000)--the rate for Minas Gerais was 82.0%
Illiteracy rate: 33.68% (15 years old or older) The rate for Minas Gerais was 11.96%; the rate for Brazil was 13.63%
Urban area covered by sewage system: 38.80%--the rate for Minas Gerais was 81.39%
Health centers and hospitals: 08 health centers and  01 hospital with 76  beds

See also
 List of municipalities in Minas Gerais

References

Municipalities in Minas Gerais